La Venexiana (founded 1995) is an Italian early music ensemble founded and led by Claudio Cavina, an Italian countertenor and conductor.

Cavina studied in Bologna with the American singer and musicologist Candace Smith, and then with the Swiss baritone Kurt Widmer and Belgian countertenor and conductor René Jacobs at the Schola Cantorum Basiliensis, then appeared regularly as a countertenor soloist and in choral works. La Venexiana, taking its name from an anonymous comedy La Venexiana ("The Venetian Girl", c.1537), was created to focus on the core four- and five-voice madrigal repertory of Sigismondo d'India, Luzzasco Luzzaschi, Luca Marenzio, Barbara Strozzi, Gesualdo da Venosa, and Claudio Monteverdi. The ensemble has later broadened to be the base of Cavina's productions and recordings of operas by Monteverdi and Francesco Cavalli.

With Cavina's increasing focus on opera, members of the ensemble have concurrently formed La Compagnia del Madrigale which has continued the Gesualdo series on the Glossa label.

Discography
 1992 – Luzzasco Luzzaschi: Concerto delle Dame
 1996 – Marcello: Arias and Duets
 1997 – Barbara Strozzi: Primo Libra de' Madrigali (1644)
 1998 – Amori e Ombre: Duets and Catatas
 1999 – Handel: The 10 Italian Duets
 1999 – Claudio Monteverdi, Luca Morenzio, Sigismondo D'India, Luzzasco Luzzaschi: Madrigali
 1999 – Monteverdi: Settimo Libro di Madrigali
 1999 – Luzzaschi: Quinto Libro de' Madrigali
 1999 – Marenzio: Ninth Book of Madrigals
 1999 – Sigismondo d'India: Terzo Libro de Madrigali
 2001 – Sigismondo d'India: Primo Libro de Madrigali
 2001 – Marenzio: Il Sesto Libro de Madrigali
 2002 – Monteverdi: Terzo Libro
 2003 – Giaches de Wert: La Gerusalemme Liberata
 2003 – La Venexiana Live!  Madrigals by Claudio Monteverdi
 2004 – Monteverdi: Quarto Libro dei Madrigali
 2004 – Monteverdi: Secondo Libro dei Madrigali (1590)
 2005 – Gesualdo: Quinto Libro di Madrigali (1611)
 2005 – Monteverdi: Sesto Libro dei Madrigali (1614)
 2005 – Monteverdi: Ottavo Libra dei Madrigali: Madrigali Geurrieri et Amorosi
 2006 – Gesualdo: Quarto libro de Madrigali
 2007 – Monteverdi: L'Orfeo
 2007 – Monteverdi: Quinto Libro dei Madrigali
 2008 – Monteverdi: Libri dei Madrigali, Books 1 and 9
 2008 – Monteverdi: Terzo Libro dei Madrigali
 2008 – Monteverdi: Selva morale e spirituale
 2009 – Monteverdi: Scherzi Musicali
 2010 – Monteverdi: Il Nerone, ossia L'incoronazione di Poppea
 2011 – 'Round M: Monteverdi Meets Jazz
 2011 – Cavalli: Artemisia
 2011 – Luzzaschi – Concerto della Dame
 2012 – Monteverdi: Il ritorno d'Ulisse in Patria

References

Early music groups